Pierre Baruzy (Amiens, 19 May 1897 – Paris, 17 December 1994) was a manager and French boxing champion.

Biography 

Of Italian origin, a descendant of a noble Venetian family, Pierre Barozzi (in French spelled Baruzy), entered the French boxing academy at the age of thirteen, where he was a pupil of Charles Charlemont and was named eleven times French champion of the weightlifting.

He participated in the 1924 Summer Olympics, the French Box is included for the first time in the 1924 Summer Olympics in Paris. In 1930 he became president of the Académie de Boxe Française and in 1937 the last French Championship was held (until its rebirth in 1966) during which he obtained the title of Champion in all categories, beating middle-weight boxer and heavy. Between 1922 and 1935 he obtained eleven championship titles.

Pierre Baruzy joined the Resistance during the Second World War. He chaired the "JP workers commission"; Under the Occupation, Baruzy was appointed municipal councilor of Paris in December 1941 by the Minister of the Interior Pierre Pucheu, and became secretary of the municipal council in 1943. He was president of the Steering Committee of Timken (France) and Chancellor of the CIOS International Academy. As an industrialist he was president of the Compagnie des ASTD and member of the Board for Meules Norton.

He was arrested in August 1944 but was awarded the Resistance Medal. He claims in 1972 to have been in contact with General Revers, head of the Army Resistance Organization (ORA) and to have been a member since 1942 of the Buckmaster network. Baruzy claims to have rescued 11 airmen from the Allied forces whose planes were shot down by the  German army. His resistance activities earned him the Medal of Freedom from General Eisenhower in 1945, as well as a second President's Medal Ronald Reagan in 1984; which makes him the only Frenchman to have received his two medals.

He was active since 1945 in the National Committee of the French Organization (CNOF), which he chaired from 1952 to 1957, after having been its general secretary. He gave new impetus to the sport in the postwar period; in 1965 he became the founding president of the French National Boxing Committee which would be replaced in 1975 by the French Boxing Federation Savate (FFBFS e DA).

Baruzy received numerous civil and military awards throughout his career. He is buried in the tomb of the Bouillon-Bey family.

Honors
Presidential Medal of Freedom(1945)
Resistance Medal(1984)

Note 

1897 births
1994 deaths
Sportspeople from Amiens
French male boxers
French savateurs
French sports executives and administrators

French nationalists
Recipients of the National Order of Scientific Merit (Brazil)
Chevaliers of the Légion d'honneur
Recipients of the Resistance Medal
Recipients of the Croix de Guerre 1914–1918 (France)
Presidential Medal of Freedom recipients
Burials at Passy Cemetery